University Schools is the former lab school affiliated with the University of Northern Colorado. It is now a charter school located in Greeley, Colorado. This was a relatively small school, but due to recent additions, including a new middle school, the school size has grown significantly. University Schools is home of the Bulldogs and is a K-12 school. University School uses an online lottery method to choose new students for the upcoming year. University Schools operates off of a trimester system, but recently the middle school has switch to a combination of both trimesters and semesters. University Schools also does not provide transportation (i.e. School bus) to or from school.

References

External links
 

Charter schools in Colorado
Greeley, Colorado
Laboratory schools in the United States
University of Northern Colorado
Schools in Weld County, Colorado